Bromperidol, sold under the brand names Bromidol and Impromen among others, is a typical antipsychotic of the butyrophenone group which is used in the treatment of schizophrenia. It was discovered at Janssen Pharmaceutica in 1966. An ester prodrug, bromperidol decanoate, is a long-acting form of bromperidol used as a depot injectable.

References

Further reading 

 
 

4-Phenylpiperidines
Belgian inventions
Bromoarenes
Butyrophenone antipsychotics
Aromatic ketones
Fluoroarenes
Janssen Pharmaceutica
Tertiary alcohols
Typical antipsychotics